Aaltje "Alie" Stijl (29 January 1923 – 20 May 1999) was a Dutch swimmer who won a silver medal in the 4 × 100 m freestyle relay at the 1938 European Aquatics Championships. Less than two years later, on 12 January 1940, she set a world record in the 100 yd breaststroke. She had no chance to compete at the Olympics, which were cancelled in 1940 and 1944. In 1941 she became engaged to a German soldier and moved to Germany, where she continued competing during the war. Around 1944 she returned to the Netherlands, and between 1948 and 1988 was married to Johan Kistemaker.

References

1923 births
1999 deaths
Dutch female freestyle swimmers
Dutch female breaststroke swimmers
European Aquatics Championships medalists in swimming
World record setters in swimming
Swimmers from Amsterdam
20th-century Dutch women